The Grassroots Source Water Protection Program, more commonly called the Source Water Protection Program, enacted in the 2002 farm bill (P.L. 107-171, Sec. 2502), authorizes the appropriation of $5 million annually in discretionary funds from FY2002 through FY2007 to use the technical assistance capabilities of rural water associations that operate wellhead or groundwater protection programs.

References

External links
Source Water Protection Program from the Farm Service Agency, United States Department of Agriculture

United States Department of Agriculture programs